Gustaf Wasa is a 1928 Swedish silent historical epic film directed by John W. Brunius and starring Gösta Ekman, Edvin Adolphson and John Ericsson. It is based on the life of the sixteenth century Swedish king Gustav I of Sweden. It was released in two parts, premiering a week apart.

Cast

 Gösta Ekman as	Gustaf Eriksson Wasa
 Edvin Adolphson as Kristian II of Denmark
 Hugo Björne as 	Sten Sture
 Hjalmar Selander as 	Matts Ers
 John Ericsson as Mats Ersson
 Estery Ericsson as 	Ma Brita
 Nils Lundell as 	Tobias
 Karl-Magnus Thulstrup as 	Pers-Olle
 Gustaf Aronsson as Henrik Möller
 Sture Baude as 	Archbishop Gustaf Trolle
 Bror Berger as The executioner
 Erik 'Bullen' Berglund as 	Claus, sentry at Kalö
 Signhild Björkman as 	Dyveke
 Renée Björling as 	Margareta Brahe
 John Borgh as 	Cord König
 Tor Borong as 	Doctor at Åsunden
 Pauline Brunius as 	Kristina Gyllenstjerna
 Bertil Brusewitz as 	Bishop Jens Beldenacke
 Elsa Burnett as 	Daughter at Svärdsjögården
 Sickan Castegren as 	Mother of Matts Ers
 Erland Colliander as	Henrik Slagheck
 Carl Ericson as 	Swedish farmer that doubts Gustaf Wasa
 Gösta Ericsson as 	Jörgen, sentry at Kalö
 Nils Ericsson as Nobleman at Kalö
 Siegfried Fischer as 	Nobleman at Kalö
 Pierre Fredriksson as 	Erik Banér
 Algot Gunnarsson as 	Nils Bröms, mayor of Lübeck
 Justus Hagman as 	Elias at Tronnevik
 Wictor Hagman as 	Kneeling man at side of wounded Sten Sture
 Carl Harald as 	Nobleman at Kalö
 Weyler Hildebrand as Danish Captain
 Thure Holm as 	Henrik Smed
 Erik Johansson as 	Man at King Kristian's court
 Rupert Johansson as 	Nobleman at Kalö
 Karl Jonsson as 	Commander at Kalö
 Olof Krook as 	Mathias, Bishop of Strängnäs
 Uno Küller as 	Nils Lykke
 Herman Lantz as 	Commander at the Stockholm bloodbath
 Sven Lindström as 	Bishop Didrik Slagheck
 Alfred Lundberg as 	Mayor of Stockholm
 Hjalmar Peters as 	Hermann Israel
 Axel Precht as Jakob Ulfsson, former Archbishop
 Sven Quick as Father of Matts Ers
 Gustav Ranft as Hemming Gadh
 Carl Ström as 	Joakim Brahe
 Karin Swanström as 	Sigbrit
 Nils Waldt as 	Servant of Sten Sture
 Ernst Öberg as 	Vicentius - Bishop of Skara

References

Bibliography
 Gustafsson, Tommy. Masculinity in the Golden Age of Swedish Cinema: A Cultural Analysis of 1920s Films. McFarland, 2014.
 Klossner, Michael. The Europe of 1500-1815 on Film and Television: A Worldwide Filmography of Over 2550 Works, 1895 Through 2000. McFarland & Company, 2002.
 Sadoul, Georges. Dictionary of Film Makers. University of California Press, 1972.

External links

1928 films
1928 drama films
Swedish silent feature films
Swedish black-and-white films
Films directed by John W. Brunius
1920s Swedish-language films
Swedish historical drama films
1920s historical drama films
Films set in the 16th century
Silent historical drama films
1920s Swedish films